Ivan Koshkosh (born 8 April 2001) is a professional Ukrainian football midfielder who plays for FC Mariupol in the Ukrainian Premier League.

Career
Born in Mariupol, Koshkosh is a product of the local Azovstal Mariupol youth sportive school system.

He made his debut for FC Mariupol in the Ukrainian Premier League as a start squad player in the losing home match against FC Shakhtar Donetsk on 10 April 2021.

References

External links
 Statistics at UAF website (Ukr)
 

2001 births
Living people
Sportspeople from Mariupol
Ukrainian footballers
FC Mariupol players
Ukrainian Premier League players
Association football midfielders
Sportspeople from Donetsk Oblast
21st-century Ukrainian people